Njeri's Morning Glory School and Art Center, located in San Jose, California, has been registered in the California Department of Education since 2008.It is an educational space for parents and children and is a 501(c)3 nonprofit organization. The school has been fulfilling California's legal and licensing requirements and meets health, fire, and safety standards. NMGS and Art Center has trained Waldorf teachers in Kindergarten through the Fifth Grade and has a commitment to cultural, social, and economic diversity. Equal value is placed on the weekly rhythm of co-curricular activities, and art is weaved into all aspects of the curriculum. The school participates in a monthly Nature exploration.

External links

Waldorf schools in the United States
Private schools in San Jose, California